Greentree is an unincorporated community and census-designated place (CDP) located within Cherry Hill Township, in Camden County, New Jersey, United States. As of the 2010 United States Census, the CDP's population was 11,367.

Geography
According to the United States Census Bureau, the Greentree CDP had a total area of 4.666 square miles (12.086 km2), including 4.659 square miles (12.067 km2) of land and 0.007 square miles (0.019 km2) of water (0.16%).

Demographics

Census 2010

Census 2000
As of the 2000 United States Census there were 11,536 people, 3,883 households, and 3,253 families living in the CDP. The population density was 953.8/km2 (2,469.1/mi2). There were 4,009 housing units at an average density of 331.5/km2 (858.1/mi2). The racial makeup of the CDP was 77.51% White, 6.05% African American, 0.07% Native American, 14.82% Asian, 0.02% Pacific Islander, 0.55% from other races, and 0.98% from two or more races. Hispanic or Latino of any race were 2.05% of the population.

There were 3,883 households, out of which 41.3% had children under the age of 18 living with them, 73.6% were married couples living together, 8.0% had a female householder with no husband present, and 16.2% were non-families. 13.8% of all households were made up of individuals, and 5.6% had someone living alone who was 65 years of age or older. The average household size was 2.94 and the average family size was 3.25.

In the CDP the population was spread out, with 27.4% under the age of 18, 5.8% from 18 to 24, 26.2% from 25 to 44, 29.7% from 45 to 64, and 10.9% who were 65 years of age or older. The median age was 40 years. For every 100 females there were 94.6 males. For every 100 females age 18 and over, there were 90.6 males.

The median income for a household in the CDP was $85,816, and the median income for a family was $94,635. Males had a median income of $67,738 versus $39,896 for females. The per capita income for the CDP was $34,371. About 1.0% of families and 2.2% of the population were below the poverty line, including 1.7% of those under age 18 and 2.4% of those age 65 or over.

References

Census-designated places in Camden County, New Jersey
Neighborhoods in Cherry Hill, New Jersey